Happy Ever After may refer to:

Happy Ever After (British TV series), a British sitcom starring Terry Scott and June Whitfield
Happy Ever After (HK TV series), a 1999 Hong Kong television drama
Happy Ever After (album), an album by The Dogs D'Amour
Happy Ever After, an album by Gangway
Happy Ever After (1932 film), a 1932 German film starring Edward Chapman
Happy Ever After (1954 film), a British comedy film starring David Niven
"Happy Ever After", 1973 single by Brotherhood of Man
"Happy Ever After" (Julia Fordham song), a 1988 single by Julia Fordham
"Happy Ever After" (Bee Gees song), a 1991 single by the Bee Gees
"Happy Ever After" (Ricki-Lee Coulter song), a 2014 single
Happy Ever After, a 2010 novel by Nora Roberts

See also
Happily Ever After (disambiguation)